Leptodermis oblonga, the baby lilac shrub, is a species of flowering plant in the family Rubiaceae, native to Mongolia, central China, and northern Vietnam. 
It is typically found growing in sunny situations on the slopes of hills, along roadsides, and in thickets. There is a cultivar, 'Summer Stars'.

References

Paederieae
Garden plants of Asia
Flora of Mongolia
Flora of Inner Mongolia
Flora of North-Central China
Flora of South-Central China
Flora of Vietnam
Plants described in 1833
Taxa named by Alexander von Bunge